In absolute geometry, the Saccheri–Legendre theorem states that the sum of the angles in a triangle is at most 180°. Absolute geometry is the geometry obtained from assuming all the axioms that lead to Euclidean geometry with the exception of the axiom that is equivalent to the parallel postulate of Euclid.

The theorem is named after Giovanni Girolamo Saccheri and Adrien-Marie Legendre.

The existence of at least one triangle with angle sum of 180 degrees in absolute geometry implies Euclid's parallel postulate. Similarly, the existence of at least one triangle with angle sum of less than 180 degrees implies the characteristic postulate of hyperbolic geometry.

Max Dehn gave an example of a non-Legendrian geometry where the angle sum of a triangle is greater than 180 degrees, and a semi-Euclidean geometry where there is a triangle with an angle sum of 180 degrees but Euclid's parallel postulate fails. In Dehn's geometries the Archimedean axiom does not hold.

Notes

Euclidean geometry
Theorems about triangles
Non-Euclidean geometry